The 1933–34 IHL season was the fifth season of the International Hockey League, a minor professional ice hockey league in the Midwestern and Eastern United States and Canada. Six teams participated in the league, and the London Tecumsehs won the championship.

Regular season

Playoffs

Final

Round Robin

External links
Season on hockeydb.com

1933 in ice hockey
1934 in ice hockey